Pilu may refer to:

People
 Pilu Khan
 Pilu Momtaz ( 1953 – 23 May 2011), Bangladeshi singer

Places
 Pilu, Arad, Romania
 Pilu, Estonia
 Pilu river, Myanmar

Other
 Pilu (raga), Hindustani music
 Pilu oil
 Pīlu
 Pilu (TV series), an Indian television series